The Bavarian Ministry of the Interior, Sport and Integration is the interior ministry of Bavaria. It is headquartered in Munich, and was established on November 21, 1806 as the Departement des Innern. The first Minister of the Interior was Count Maximilian von Montgelas (until 1817).

Since October 16, 2007, Joachim Herrmann (CSU) has been Minister of the Interior.

List of interior ministers of Bavaria since 1806 (incomplete)

Maximilian Graf von Montgelas, 1806-1817
Friedrich Karl Graf von Thürheim, 1817-1826
Josef Ludwig Graf von Armansperg, 1 January 1826 - 1 September  1828
Eduard von Schenk, 1 September 1828 – 27 May 1831
Johann Baptist von Stürmer, 27 May – 31 December 1831 (acting)
Ludwig Fürst von Oettingen-Wallerstein, 31 December 1831 – 4 November 1837
Karl (von) Abel, 5 November 1837 – 13 February 1847 (acting until 31 March 1838)
Anton von Fischer, 13 February - 1 March 1847 (acting)
Johann Baptist von Zenetti, 1 March 1847 – 1 December 1847 (acting)
Franz von Berks, 1 December 1847 - 5 March 1848 (acting)
Gottlieb Friedrich Freiherr von Thon-Dittmer, 8 March - 14 November 1848
Gustav Freiherr von Lerchenfeld, 15 November - 18 December 1848
Moritz von Weigend, 19–31 December 1848
Hermann von Beisler, 31 December 1848 - 9 June 1849
Theodor von Zwehl, 9 Juni 1849 - 20 November 1852
August Lothar Graf von Reigersberg, 20 November 1852 - 1 May 1859
Max Ritter von Neumayr, 1 May 1859 - 7 November 1865

...

Karl August Fischer (non-partisan), 1945
Josef Seifried (SPD), 1945-1947
Willi Ankermüller (CSU), 1947-1950
Wilhelm Hoegner (SPD), 1950-1954
August Geislhöringer (Bayernpartei), 1954-1957
Otto Bezold (FDP), 1957-1958
Alfons Goppel (CSU), 1958-1962
Heinrich Junker (CSU), 1962-1966
Bruno Merk (CSU), 1966-1977
Alfred Seidl (CSU), 1977-1978
Gerold Tandler (CSU), 1978-1982
Karl Hillermeier (CSU), 1982-1986
August Richard Lang (CSU), 1986-1988
Edmund Stoiber (CSU), 1988-1993
Günther Beckstein (CSU), 1993-2007
Joachim Herrmann (CSU), since 2007

References

External links
 The Bavarian Ministry of the Interior

Government of Bavaria
History of Munich
1806 establishments in Bavaria